American singer Justin Timberlake has embarked on five concert tours during his solo career, three of which have been worldwide and two of which have been collaborative. His 2003 debut The Justified World Tour began at intimate gigs at clubs and theatres in the United States and Australia before expanding to arenas in Europe. In summer 2003, Timberlake and Christina Aguilera headlined the Justified/Stripped Tour. Later that year he recorded a song "I'm Lovin' It", used by McDonald's as the theme to its "I'm Lovin' It" campaign. The deal with McDonald's earned Timberlake an estimated $6 million. A tour titled Justified and Lovin' It Live was included with the deal, following his initial Justified World Tour. For the release of his sophomore record FutureSex/LoveSounds, Timberlake embarked on his second worldwide tour FutureSex/LoveShow in 2007, which eventually became the third highest-grossing concert tour of the year. During the tour, he visited Asia, Europe, North America and Oceania.

In 2013, Timberlake took part in his second collaborative tour, Legends of the Summer, in which he was co-headlining with rapper, frequent collaborator Jay-Z. The all-stadium tour that took place in North America was praised by music critics, who highlighted the great chemistry between both artists. It was followed by The 20/20 Experience World Tour, which became the second highest-grossing tour of 2014 and one of the highest-grossing tours of the decade. This made Timberlake the highest-grossing solo touring artist of the year. The Man of the Woods Tour is his sixth and most recent concert tour. Timberlake's televised performances include his debut at the 2002 MTV Video Music Awards, the controversial Super Bowl XXXVIII halftime show as a guest act, his comeback performance at the 55th Annual Grammy Awards, his medley number at the 2013 MTV Video Music Awards, several appearances on Saturday Night Live and the Super Bowl LII halftime show.

Concert tours

Concerts

Guest act

Award show performances

See also
Justin Timberlake videography

Notes

References

External links
 

 
T